Zion Bailus McKinney (born February 10, 1958) is a former American football wide receiver in the National Football League for the Washington Redskins.  He played college football at the University of South Carolina.

He is now a truancy officer for Fairfax County Public Schools.

1958 births
Living people
American football wide receivers
People from Pickens, South Carolina
South Carolina Gamecocks football players
Washington Redskins players